Arthur Henry Barrett (21 December 1927 – 10 January 2011) was an English footballer, who played as a wing half in the Football League for Tranmere Rovers.

References

External links

Tranmere Rovers F.C. players
English Football League players
1927 births
2011 deaths
Footballers from Liverpool
Association football wing halves
English footballers